Error-driven learning is a sub-area of machine learning concerned with how an agent ought to take actions in an environment so as to minimize some error feedback. It is a type of reinforcement learning.

Algorithms
 GeneRec

Machine learning algorithms